Diamara Rosaura Planell Cruz (born February 16, 1993) is a Puerto Rican track and field athlete who specialises in the pole vault. She has qualified for 2016 Summer Olympics. 
Los Altos women's pole vault school record, CCS Champion CA state meet competitor
San Jose city College school record holder, 2 time CA Junior College state meet champion, CA state meet record

She attended San Jose City College in San Jose, California.

Personal bests

References

External links 
 

1993 births
Living people
Sportspeople from San Juan, Puerto Rico
Puerto Rican female track and field athletes
Puerto Rican female pole vaulters
Olympic female pole vaulters
Olympic track and field athletes of Puerto Rico
Athletes (track and field) at the 2016 Summer Olympics
Pan American Games competitors for Puerto Rico
Athletes (track and field) at the 2019 Pan American Games
Central American and Caribbean Games silver medalists for Puerto Rico
Central American and Caribbean Games medalists in athletics
Competitors at the 2014 Central American and Caribbean Games
University of Washington alumni
San Jose City College alumni
Athletes (track and field) at the 2015 Pan American Games
21st-century Puerto Rican women